L'Aldosa is the name of two localities in Andorra:

L'Aldosa de Canillo, in the parish of Canillo
L'Aldosa de la Massana, in the parish of La Massana